Sagaranella is a mushroom genus in the family Lyophyllaceae that has been segregated from both Lyophyllum and Tephrocybe using molecular analyses. The species resemble grey colored Collybias and grow in nitrogen-rich environments.

Etymology
The name Sagaranella honours Professor Naohiko Sagara, a Japanese mycologist who has extensively studied ammonia fungi such as this genus.

See also
List of Agaricales genera

References

External links

Agaricales genera
Lyophyllaceae